Yarlton College ( Yāḻṟraṉ Kallūri) is a provincial school in Karainagar, Sri Lanka.

See also
 List of schools in Northern Province, Sri Lanka

References

External links
 Yarlton College

Provincial schools in Sri Lanka
Schools in Jaffna District